The Alliance Premier League season of 1981–82 was the third season of the Alliance Premier League.

New teams in the league this season
 Dagenham (promoted 1980–81)
 Dartford (promoted 1980–81)
 Enfield (promoted 1980–81)
 Runcorn (promoted 1980–81)
 Trowbridge Town (promoted 1980–81)

Final table

Results

Top scorers

Promotion and relegation

Promoted

 Bangor City (from the Northern Premier League)
 Nuneaton (from the Southern Premier League)
 Wealdstone (from the Southern Premier League)

All of these teams had been relegated from the Alliance Premier League after the 1981–82 season.

Relegated

 Dartford (to the Southern Premier League)
 Gravesend & Northfleet (to the Southern Premier League)
 AP Leamington (to the Southern Premier League)

Election to the Football League
This year Runcorn, the winners of the Alliance Premier League, could not apply for election because they did not meet Football League requirements. 2nd placed Enfield could not apply either for the same reasons, so 3rd placed Telford United won the right to apply for election to the Football League to replace one of the four bottom sides in the 1981–82 Football League Fourth Division. The vote went as follows:

As a result of this, Telford United did not gain membership of the Football League.

References

External links
 1981–82 Conference National Results
 Re-election Results – The Division Four final league table, including the results of the re-election vote.

National League (English football) seasons
5